Iuliu Safar (born 22 April 1985), is a Romanian futsal player who plays as an Ala.

References

External links
LNFS profile
UEFA profile

1985 births
Living people
Romanian men's futsal players